Danny Noble (March 30, 1989) is an American football tight end who is currently a free agent.

College career
Noble played tight end for University of Toledo.

Professional career
Noble was an undrafted rookie for the Tampa Bay Buccaneers in 2012 and made the 53 man roster on August 31, 2012. On October 30, Noble was placed on injured reserve.

Noble was signed by the Jacksonville Jaguars to their practice squad in October 2013 and was promoted to the active roster on November 4. He recorded his first career reception on a 62-yard touchdown pass from Chad Henne against the Arizona Cardinals.

Noble was released by the Jaguars on May 2, 2014.

References

External links
Tampa Bay Buccaneers bio

1989 births
Living people
American football tight ends
Jacksonville Jaguars players
Toledo Rockets football players
Tampa Bay Buccaneers players